St John Bosco Arts College is a Roman Catholic comprehensive secondary school for girls in Croxteth, Liverpool.

Admissions
The school caters for girls between the ages of 11 and 19 and the number of girls on roll is 900. 35% of the girls receive free school meals.

History

Grammar school
The school was a girls' grammar school, the Mary Help of Christians Convent, from the mid-1960s. The neighbouring boys' grammar school was the De la Salle Grammar School, which is now Dixons Croxteth Academy.

Other girls' Catholic grammar schools in Liverpool were Convent of Mercy Girls High School, Notre Dame High School for Girls and La Sagesse Girls High School. Of the nine grammar schools that survived until the mid-1980s in Liverpool, most were Catholic due to their voluntary-aided status.

Comprehensive
The school became a catholic comprehensive in 1983. The Salesian Sisters of St John Bosco are also known as the Daughters of Mary Help of Christians. It was known as the St John Bosco High School until September 2004 when it became an Arts College.  In March 2013 the college became a National Teaching School.

New build
In September 2014 a new state of the art school was opened with a new grey and pink school uniform for all students.

Academic performance
The school gets excellent results at GCSE which were above the national average in 2014 with 100% 5 A-C grades at GCSE and 61% including English and Mathematics.

Notable former pupils

Mary Help of Christians R.C. High School
 Shelagh Fogarty, 5 Live lunchtime presenter
 Fiona Jones (nee Hamilton), Labour MP from 1997–2001 for Newark
 Jane McGoldrick, television producer

St John Bosco High School
 Coleen Rooney, English television presenter, columnist and celebrity product endorser

References

External links
 School website
 Salesian Sisters of St John Bosco
 EduBase
 New Home for St John Bosco from Liverpool Echo

1983 establishments in England
Secondary schools in Liverpool
Educational institutions established in 1983
Girls' schools in Merseyside
Catholic secondary schools in the Archdiocese of Liverpool
Salesian secondary schools
Voluntary aided schools in England